Parabacteroides timonensis  is a Gram-negative and rod-shaped  bacterium from the genus of Parabacteroides which has been isolated from human faeces.

References 

Bacteroidia
Bacteria described in 2019